Ko Ko (born 13 November 1960) is a Burmese dental professor who currently serves as rector of the University of Dental Medicine, Mandalay.

Early life and education
Ko was born in Yangon, Myanmar, on 13 November 1960. He graduated from University of Dental Medicine, Yangon, in July 1986. He received M.D.Sc in 1996 and Dr.D.Sc in 2014.

References

1960 births
Burmese dental professors
Living people